M. minutus  may refer to:
 Micromys minutus, the harvest mouse, a small rodent species native to Europe and Asia
 Microryzomys minutus, the montane colilargo or forest small rice rat, a rodent species found in Bolivia, Colombia, Ecuador, Peru and Venezuela

See also
 List of Latin and Greek words commonly used in systematic names#M